Thomas Compton Arthur MSP (born 1985) is a Scottish National Party (SNP) politician. He is the Member of the Scottish Parliament (MSP) for the constituency of Renfrewshire South, having been first elected in 2016 and re-elected in 2021. In May 2021 he was appointed Minister for Public Finance, Planning and Community Wealth in the Scottish Government.

Background
Arthur was born in 1985 in Paisley, Renfrewshire and raised in Barrhead, East Renfrewshire, where he was educated at Cross Arthurlie Primary and Barrhead High School. He graduated with a Bachelor of Music then later Master of Music from the University of Glasgow. Before entering politics, he worked as a company director, freelance piano teacher and keyboardist.

Political career
Arthur joined the Scottish National Party in 2009. He was elected as the first SNP Member of the Scottish Parliament (MSP) for the Renfrewshire South constituency at the 2016 Scottish Parliament election. Arthur made his debut speech in the Scottish Parliament on 26 May 2016.

He was re-elected in the 2021 Scottish Parliament election with a 50.5% vote share in the constituency and gained an increased majority of 7,106 votes or 20.5% over the nearest challenger. In May 2021 he was appointed Minister for Public Finance, Planning and Community Wealth in the Scottish Government.

References

External links
 
 profile on SNP website

1985 births
Living people
Politicians from Paisley, Renfrewshire
Ministers of the Scottish Government
Alumni of the University of Glasgow
Scottish solicitors
Scottish National Party MSPs
Members of the Scottish Parliament 2016–2021
Members of the Scottish Parliament 2021–2026
People from Barrhead